This is a list of the county governors (Fylkesmenn) of Østfold, Norway.

References

Ostfold